Canal Institucional is a Colombian public Terrestrial television channel launched on February 2, 2004 to replace Canal A after its merger with the programmer Audiovisuales.

The television station broadcasts the sessions of the Congress of the Republic and other governmental institutional programs, which until 2003 were broadcast by Señal Colombia in co-production with the Canal Congreso.

History 
On February 2, 2004, the channel was born under the name "Señal Colombia Institucional", replacing Canal A. As a measure to the public television crisis that year, the channel was created under the control of Inravisión and operated by the programming company Audiovisuales. However, in October of that year, after the dissolution of Inravisión and Audiovisuales by the national government, the channel has since been operated by RTVC Sistema de Medios Públicos.

External links
 https://www.canalinstitucional.tv/

Television networks in Colombia
Television stations in Colombia
Television channels and stations established in 1966
Spanish-language television stations

See also 
 Canal A
 Señal Colombia
 Canal 1
 Radio Nacional de Colombia
 Radiónica
 RTVC Sistema de Medios Públicos